Csaba Vidáts (born 22 November 1947) is a Hungarian former footballer. He competed in the men's tournament at the 1972 Summer Olympics.

References

External links
 

1947 births
Living people
Hungarian footballers
Hungary international footballers
Olympic footballers of Hungary
Footballers at the 1972 Summer Olympics
Sportspeople from Győr-Moson-Sopron County
Association football defenders
Olympic silver medalists for Hungary
Olympic medalists in football
Medalists at the 1972 Summer Olympics
Vasas SC players